Heads or Tails is a 2005 film written and directed by Joey McAdams and Clark Kline. Produced by Fool Martyr Productions, the film stars Jeff Keilholtz, Douglas Cathro and Jon Liddiard.

The screenplay was adapted  from a short story Kline wrote in 1994.  Shooting began in September 2003 with a script that was shrouded in secrecy even from cast and crew, as each were given the day's lines on the day a scene was to be shot.  Its premiere gala acreening was at The Weinberg Center for the Arts in February 2005.  A review by Courtney Oates of The Flow magazine describes Heads or Tails as an "incredibly unique story of murder, myths and mania."  It was released to DVD in the spring  of 2008.

Synopsis
Heads or Tails is a dark drama: the story of a Native American myth and how it has been twisted throughout the years into something much darker. Every thirteen cycles of the moon, two people stand on a cliff and throw a coin off to compete for a wish. Only those that partake in the ritual see that the wish is only the beginning.

Cast
 Jeff Keilholtz as Blaze
 Jon Liddiard as Typhoon
 Douglas Cathro as Miller
 Amber Davila as Kari
 Mike Hotovy as John
 Madalyn Loughlin as Anise

additional cast

Additional sources
Maryland Gazette, "...Joey McAdams, a director and producer with Fool Martyr productions..."
Film Fodder, "Fool Martyr Q&A"
Tunecore, Heads Or Tails Motion Picture Soundtrack by Will Sxton on fool martyr productions
Hunnting Dragonflies, "...Douglas 'DC' Cathro recently made his feature screen debut in the Fool Martyr production Heads or Tails."
Cinemarts, "Formed in 2003, Fool Martyr Productions, an ultra-low budget production company, screened their first feature film Heads or Tails to a capacity audience at the Weinberg in early 2005 and stirred a lively debate in the local paper for weeks after the screening."
Frederick News Post, filmmaker "Joey McAdams meets up with Wiley Mackintosh and Elina Mavashev to shoot "below" at various locations around Frederick"
Mobie Bytes, "...Joey McAdams formed Fool Martyr Productions, LLC in 2003 with writing partner Clark Kline..."

References

External links
Heads or Tails at Internet Movie Database
Official Website
Heads of Tails soundtrack
Head or Tails flash game

2005 drama films
American drama films
2005 films
2000s English-language films
2000s American films